The 2006 ITU Triathlon World Championships were held in Lausanne, Switzerland on September 2 and September 3, 2006.

Results

Men's Championship

Women's Championship

References
Triathlon - 2006 World Championships - Results Men
2006 Lausanne ITU Triathlon World Championships

World Triathlon Series
World Championships
Triathlon World Championships
International sports competitions hosted by Switzerland
Triathlon competitions in Switzerland